Ricardo René Larémont is a political scientist at Binghamton University, where he has been teaching Islamic Politics and Islamic Law in the North Africa and the Sahel.

Education

Ricardo René Larémont graduated from New York University in 1976, with a B.A., cum laude in political science. He received Juris Doctor from NYU in 1979, and a Ph.D. in political science from Yale University in 1995.

Larémont is fluent in English, French, Spanish and Arabic. He also speaks Italian.

Career
Larémont was a visiting assistant professor of political science in Vassar College in 1995. After that he shortly taught at Columbia University, serving as the assistant director of Institute of African Studies.

He joined Binghamton University in 1997 with joint appointment from the political science and sociology departments. He was also the associate director of the Institute of Global Cultural Studies, headed by Ali Mazrui. In 2002, his title was succeeded by Seifudein Adem.

Larémont was promoted to associate professor with tenure in 2002. In the same year he was elected Chair of sociology department and served until 2007. He became the interim dean of Harpur College of Arts and Science in 2007.

In 2013, Larémont became a senior fellow of Atlantic Council.

Works

Membership of Organizations
 African Studies Association
 American Political Science Association
 American Institute for Maghreb Studies
 Middle East Studies Association

External links
 
 Biography on Atlantic Council

Geopoliticians
Binghamton University faculty
State University of New York faculty
New York University alumni
Historians of Africa
Year of birth missing (living people)
Living people